"Watching the Wheels" is a single by John Lennon released posthumously in 1981, after his murder. The B-side features Yoko Ono's "Yes, I'm Your Angel." It was the third and final single released from Lennon and Ono's album Double Fantasy, and reached No. 10 in the US on the Billboard Hot 100 and No. 7 on Cashbox's Top 100. It peaked at number 30 in the UK.

Writing and recording
In "Watching the Wheels" Lennon addresses those who were confounded by his "househusband" years, 1975–1980, during which he retired from the music industry to concentrate on raising his son Sean with Ono. The acoustic demo of "Watching the Wheels" is featured in the ending credits to the 2009 film Funny People. The song features a hammered dulcimer accompanying the lead piano.  Though most of the musicians on the album were well-known and oft-recorded session players, the dulcimer was played by one Matthew Cunningham; producer Jack Douglas invited Cunningham to the session after having heard him playing dulcimer on the streets of New York.

Reception
Record World called it "a strong statement of independence and self-assurance that never grows old."

Artwork
The photograph on the cover was taken by Paul Goresh, a fan of Lennon who also took the infamous photo of Lennon signing the copy of Double Fantasy belonging to Mark David Chapman shortly before Chapman murdered Lennon. Both photos were taken at the same place, in front of the Dakota building, which was the site of his 1980 shooting. Later, Chapman was recorded in police custody reciting the line "People say I'm crazy" from the song and was later sampled for use by the band EMF in the track "Lies" from their 1991 album Schubert Dip; however, upon immediate protests by Yoko Ono the sampling was removed on subsequent pressings.

Personnel
John Lennon – vocals, piano, keyboards
Earl Slick, Hugh McCracken –  lead guitar
Tony Levin – bass guitar
George Small – keyboards, piano, Fender Rhodes
Eric Troyer – Prophet-5
Andy Newmark – drums
 Matthew Cunningham – hammer dulcimer
Arthur Jenkins – percussion
 Michelle Simpson, Cassandra Wooten, Cheryl Mason Jacks, Eric Troyer – backing vocals

Chart performance

Weekly charts

Year-end charts

Cover versions
The song has been covered by Gwen Guthrie (1992), The Samples (1997); Paraguayan rock band Deliverans released a Spanish version on the compilation album Lennon Vive: Un tributo del Rock paraguayo (2000), Matisyahu for the benefit album Instant Karma: The Amnesty International Campaign to Save Darfur (2007), and Charly García under the name "Mirando las ruedas" for his album Kill Gil (2010). Patrick Wolf re-arranged the song for a performance at Yoko Ono's Meltdown Festival at the Southbank Centre.

An acoustic demo version of the song, performed by Lennon, was featured on the soundtrack of Judd Apatow's 2009 film Funny People.

In 2020, a cover of the song by Chris Cornell, a huge fan of John Lennon, was included on his posthumous album No One Sings Like You Anymore, Vol. 1.

References

John Lennon songs
1981 singles
Songs written by John Lennon
Song recordings produced by Jack Douglas (record producer)
Song recordings produced by John Lennon
Song recordings produced by Yoko Ono
Songs released posthumously
Geffen Records singles
1980 songs
Songs about fathers